Pullambadi block is a revenue block in the Tiruchirappalli district of Tamil Nadu, India. It has a total of 33 panchayat villages. It is the one of the two revenue  blocks in lalgudi taluk another one is the revenue block of lalgudi .The Notable villages or town name was   Kallakkudi, Malvai,Kallagam, Thapai,E.Vellanur,P.Sangenthi.

References 

 

Revenue blocks of Tiruchirappalli district